José Correia (born 22 October 1996) known as Zé Turbo, is a Bissau-Guinean professional footballer who plays as a forward for Al-Markhiya SC in Qatar.

He was on the books of Sporting and Inter Milan as a teenager, but did not make a senior appearance for either club, instead having loans at lower-league teams in Portugal, Italy and Spain. In 2018 he moved to South America and represented Newell's Old Boys of Argentina and Club Nacional of Paraguay.

Football career

Sporting
Zé Turbo was formed at Real Sport Clube before transferring across Lisbon to Sporting Clube de Portugal in 2014. After scoring twice against Maribor in the UEFA Youth League, he signed a five-year contract with a buyout clause of €45 million that November, amidst interest from a host of Italian and English teams and Sporting's rivals Benfica and Porto.

Inter Milan
In February 2015, he moved to Inter Milan. On 31 May, in the final game of the season at home to Empoli, he was called up to a senior squad for the first time, remaining unused in a 4–3 victory.

On 4 August 2016, Zé Turbo was loaned to Portuguese Primeira Liga team Tondela on a season-long loan. Sixteen days later, he made his professional debut in a match at Chaves, replacing Miguel Cardoso for the final 19 minutes of a 1–1 draw.  On 15 January 2017, he was loaned to Marbella in Spain's Segunda División B for the rest of the season. He made his debut for them two weeks later as an 82nd-minute substitute for Kike Márquez in a 3–2 home win over Atlético Mancha Real. 

On 24 August 2017, Zé Turbo signed for Serie C club Catania on a season-long loan. He made his debut on 2 September, playing the final nine minutes of a 1–0 loss at Casertana in place of Cristian Caccetta. His loan was terminated on 17 January 2018.

After his time in Catania, Zé Turbo was immediately loaned to S.C. Olhanense of the third-tier Campeonato de Portugal for the remainder of the season. He played 12 games for the team from the Algarve and scored his first senior goal to open a 2–1 win at Clube Olímpico do Montijo on 15 April.

South America
In July 2018, Zé Turbo moved to Newell's Old Boys of the Argentine Primera División, signing a one-year contract on a free transfer. He made one appearance for the team from Rosario, as a 70th-minute substitute for Luís Leal in a 1–0 loss to Club Atlético Aldosivi on 25 November.

At the start of 2019 he moved on to Club Nacional of the Paraguayan Primera División.

Switzerland
On 17 July 2019, Zé Turbo returned to Europe and signed a two-year deal with Swiss Challenge League club FC Schaffhausen. Eleven days later he made his debut as a starter the season began with a 2–0 loss at FC Vaduz, being substituted for Karim Barry after 58 minutes. On 5 October he scored his first goal, the game's only away to FC Chiasso.

Remaining in the same league, Zé Turbo cancelled his contract to move to Grasshopper Club Zürich on 17 February 2020, on a deal until 2023. He scored one goal in the remainder of the season, as a substitute in a 5–3 home win over his previous employer on 21 July.

China
In February 2021, Zé Turbo moved to Chinese second tier club Nantong Zhiyun.

Personal life
Two days after his professional debut, Zé Turbo was involved in a car crash in Santa Comba Dão, suffering only  light injuries to his arm.

Career statistics

References

External links

Stats and profile at LPFP 

1996 births
Living people
Sportspeople from Bissau
Bissau-Guinean footballers
Association football forwards
Inter Milan players
Primeira Liga players
C.D. Tondela players
Segunda División B players
Marbella FC players
Catania S.S.D. players
Serie C players
S.C. Olhanense players
Campeonato de Portugal (league) players
Argentine Primera División players
Newell's Old Boys footballers
Club Nacional footballers
Paraguayan Primera División players
FC Schaffhausen players
Grasshopper Club Zürich players
Nantong Zhiyun F.C. players
Swiss Challenge League players
Bissau-Guinean expatriate footballers
Bissau-Guinean expatriate sportspeople in Italy
Bissau-Guinean expatriate sportspeople in Spain
Bissau-Guinean expatriate sportspeople in Argentina
Bissau-Guinean expatriate sportspeople in Paraguay
Bissau-Guinean expatriate sportspeople in Switzerland
Bissau-Guinean expatriate sportspeople in China
Expatriate footballers in Italy
Expatriate footballers in Spain
Expatriate footballers in Argentina
Expatriate footballers in Paraguay
Expatriate footballers in Switzerland
Expatriate footballers in China